Rolf Gustav Lundberg  is a Norwegian handball player.

He made his debut on the Norwegian national team in 1966, 
and played 29 matches for the national team between 1966 and 1976. He participated at the 1967 World Men's Handball Championship.

References

Year of birth missing (living people)
Living people
Norwegian male handball players